This is a list of all cricketers who have played first-class or List A cricket for East Zone cricket team.

Last updated at the end of the 2015/16 season.

A–F

 Varun Aaron
 Zahir Alam
 Syed Mushtaq Ali
 Bellipadi Sridhar Alva
 Pravin Amre
 J. Arunkumar
 Parvez Aziz
 Balendu Shah
 Malay Banerjee
 Rabi Banerjee
 Sambaran Banerjee
 Montu Banerjee
 Shute Banerjee
 Sunil Banerjee
 Subroto Banerjee
 Tapan Banerjee
 Uday Banerjee
 Ajay Barik
 Madhurya Barua
 Tapan Barua
 Natraj Behera
 Niranjan Behera
 Prakash Bhandari
 Narsimh Bhandari
 Bimal Bharali
 Anil Bhardwaj
 Ramesh Bhatia
 Aloke Bhattacharjee
 Anil Bhattacharjee
 Sunil Bhattacharjee
 Arup Bhattacharya
 Ranjib Biswal
 Nripesh Biswas
 Rajesh Borah
 Bimal Bose
 Gopal Bose
 Kartick Bose
 Pannalal Bose
 Ranadeb Bose
 Sivaji Bose
 Barun Burman
 Samir Chakrabarti
 Dibyendu Chakrabarty
 Gopal Chakraborty
 Kanu Chakravarthy
 Timir Chanda
 Chatrapalsinhji
 Anirban Chatterjee
 Nirmal Chatterjee
 Premangsu Chatterjee
 Sudip Chatterjee
 Utpal Chatterjee
 Govind Chauhan
 Nirode Chowdhury
 Denis Compton
 Daljit Singh
 Daljit Singh
 Michael Dalvi
 Amal Das
 Ajoy Das
 Arindam Das
 Halhadar Das
 Kajal Das
 Kamal Das
 Mintoo Das
 Palash Das
 Pallavkumar Das
 Parag Das
 Shiv Sunder Das
 Subhomoy Das
 Subroto Das
 Sudhir Das
 Sritam Das
 Deep Dasgupta
 Sourav Dasgupta
 Punya Datta
 Rana Dutta
 Kumar Deobrat
 Rajeev Deora
 Chiranjib Dey
 Dhananjay Singh
 Mahendra Singh Dhoni
 Ashok Dinda
 Mihir Diwakar
 Dilip Doshi
 Karun Dubey
 Gautam Dutta
 Tapan Dutta
 Farsatullah
 Benjamin Frank

G–L

 Hiralal Gaekwad
 Devang Gandhi
 Ashok Gandotra
 Snehasish Ganguly
 Sourav Ganguly
 Shiv Gautam
 Rohan Gavaskar
 Anup Ghatak
 Ashok Ghosh
 Biren Ghosh
 Gour Ghosh
 Jiban Ghosh
 Probal Ghosh
 Prasanta Ghosh
 Shanti Ghoshal
 Hari Gidwani
 S. K. Girdhari
 Baldev Gossain
 Chuni Goswami
 Dhiraj Goswami
 Shreevats Goswami
 Subrata Guha
 Surup Guha Thakurta
 Sunny Gupta
 Vinod Gupta
 Nikhil Haldipur
 Abani Hazarika
 Probir Hazarika
 Narendra Hirwani
 Adil Hussain
 Mark Ingty
 Dheeraj Jadhav
 Madhavsinh Jagdale
 Ishank Jaggi
 Asjit Jaiprakasham
 Pinninti Jayachandra
 Rusi Jeejeebhoy
 Bisuddh Jena
 Abhishek Jhunjhunwala
 Jodh Singh
 Mayur Kadrekar
 Munna Kakoti
 Shrikant Kalyani
 Sushil Kapoor
 Saba Karim
 Anand Katti
 Ramnath Kenny
 Iqbal Khan
 Shahid Khan
 Shahid Khan
 Vinod Khullar
 Lester King
 Arlen Konwar
 Yajuvendra Krishanatry
 Avinash Kumar
 Rajiv Kumar
 Sunil Kumar
 Tarun Kumar
 Soumendranath Kundu
 Gyiani Kunzru
 Alokendru Lahiri
 Saurashish Lahiri
 Arun Lal
 Jagdish Lal
 Raymond Lewis

M–R

 Devashish Mahanti
 Anustup Majumdar
 Wrichik Majumder
 Ashok Malhotra
 Alok Mangaraj
 Deepak Mangaraj
 Vinoo Mankad
 S. S. Misra
 Abhik Mitra
 Shyam Mitra
 Kalyan Mitter
 Basant Mohanty
 Debasis Mohanty
 Rakesh Mohanty
 Biswa Mohapatra
 Prasanta Mohapatra
 Sourajit Mohapatra
 B. Moitra
 Robin Morris
 Dattatreya Mukherjee
 Deb Mukherjee
 Durga Mukherjee
 Joydeep Mukherjee
 Priyankar Mukherjee
 Raja Mukherjee
 Raju Mukherjee
 Robin Mukherjee
 Saradindu Mukherjee
 Pravanjan Mullick
 Shahbaz Nadeem
 Nagesh Singh
 Arnab Nandi
 Palash Nandy
 Pranob Nandy
 C. K. Nayudu
 C. S. Nayudu
 Abu Nechim
 Rameez Nemat
 B. B. Nimbalkar
 Narayan Nivsarkar
 Sandir Om Prakash
 Phiroze Palia
 Rabi Panda
 Sumit Panda
 Pradeep Pandey
 Chandrakant Pandit
 Paramjit Singh
 Rashmi Parida
 Lalitendu Parija
 T. V. Parthasarathi
 Mandayam Parthasarathy
 Arun Patel
 Paresh Patel
 Sudhir Pathak
 Bikas Pati
 Banabasi Patnaik
 Shib Paul
 J. P. Phansalkar
 Prakash Poddar
 Govinda Podder
 Subroto Porel
 Kiran Powar
 Harmohan Praharaj
 Sushil Kumar Prasad
 Samar Quadri
 Vijay Rajindernath
 Rajinder Singh
 Rajinder Singh
 Lalchand Rajput
 Randhir Singh
 K. V. P. Rao
 Shankar Rao
 Sanjay Raul
 Amiya Ray
 Amitava Roy
 Ambar Roy
 Indu Roy
 Nemailal Roy
 Pankaj Roy
 Pranab Roy
 Sandip Roy
 Sibsankar Roy

S–Z

 Tushar Saha
 Wriddhiman Saha
 Alok Sahoo
 Somnath Sahoo
 Subhrajit Saikia
 Vinayak Samant
 Biplab Samantray
 Sushil Sanghvi
 Rajen Sanyal
 Sanjib Sanyal
 Souren Sanyal
 Vasanth Saravanan
 Arindam Sarkar
 Dipankar Sarkar
 Chandu Sarwate
 Rajagopal Sathish
 Sanjay Satpathy
 Sanjay Kumar Satpathy
 Santanu Satpathy
 Satyendra Singh
 Iresh Saxena
 Ramesh Saxena
 Probir Sen
 Sagarmoy Sensharma
 Mohammed Shami
 Chetan Sharma
 Deepak Sharma
 Gokul Sharma
 Shibsagar Singh
 Gautam Shome
 Gautam Kumar Shome
 Anand Shukla
 Lakshmi Ratan Shukla
 Rahul Shukla
 Rakesh Shukla
 R. Sikdar
 Akilesh Sinha
 Ashis Sinha
 Sanjeev Sinha
 Sekhar Sinha
 Venkataraman Sivaramakrishnan
 Sukhvinder Singh
 Nyayapathy Swamy
 Tariq-ur-Rehman
 Tarjinder Singh
 G. Tilak Raj
 Manoj Tiwary
 Saurabh Tiwary
 Prashant Vaidya
 Manish Vardhan
 Veer Pratap Singh
 V. Venkatram
 Raja Venkatraman
 Akash Verma
 Virat Singh
 Wahidullah
 Javed Zaman
 Zakaria Zuffri

References

East Zone cricketers